V. Kumar (28 July 1934 – 7 January 1996) was a yesteryear Tamil cinema music director, born in Chennai, Tamilnadu on 28 July 1934 to Varadharajulu and Dhanabhakiyam couple, in July 1969 he married a Tamil cinema playback singer Swarna and had a son Suresh. V.Kumar is known as Mellisai MaamaNi, was introduced to Tamil film music by K. Balachander.

He has used P.Susheela S. P. Balasubrahmanyam for many of his songs. He has been the aasthana MD for K. Balachandar films. Before that, he scored music for his Stage Dramas.

Discography
Their works include music for the following movies:

References
V.Kumar Compositions
Cinema Express article on V.Kumar – Part 1
Cinema Express article on V.Kumar – Part 2
Cinema Express article on V.Kumar – Part 3

Tamil musicians
Telugu people
1934 births
1996 deaths
20th-century composers
20th-century Indian musicians
Tamil film score composers